Valērijs Belokoņs or Valeri Belokon (born 14 February 1960) is a Latvian businessman.

For his continuous support of Latvian literature he is well known as Patron of literature.

Education
Born in Riga, when Latvia was a part of the Soviet Union, Belokoņs studied at the University of Massachusetts Amherst (USA) and the University of Latvia, Faculty of Philology.

Business career
Belokoņs is the chairperson of the supervisory board of Baltic International Bank, and his corporation Belokoņs Holdings has interests in finance, media, the Food industry and social projects in Latvia as well as football in England.

In the 1980s, prior to becoming involved in business, Belokoņs worked as a correspondent in Soviet Youth newspaper in Latvia.

Main business interests:

Finance and investments 
Baltic International Bank – founded in 1993, servicing VIP customers. Position - founder, main shareholder and chairman of the supervisory board. Representative offices opened in Moscow in 2004, London in 2005, and Kyiv in 2007. In 2020, Belokon held a 62.08% stake and his brother Vilorijs Belokon held a 32.99% stake. On 11 February 1999,  became insolvent and on 23 December 1999 the "BALTIJAS STARPTAUTISKĀ BANKA" (BSB), which is what Baltic International Bank was known as then, gained Lainbanka's assets.
Maval Aktivi AS - a holding company jointly formed in June 2006 with Maxim Bakiev
JSC "Brīvais vilnis" establish 1 December 2014. Formerly known as  SIA „BALTIC FINANCE & CAPITAL” until 1 December 2014 when JSC "Brīvais vilnis" gained a 100% stake and on 2 December 2014 SIA „BALTIC FINANCE & CAPITAL” was removed from the register of Latvian companies. On 1 December 2014, the brothers Belokon, who act in concert, held a 97.25% stake in JSC "Brīvais vilnis". On 11 February 2019, JSC "Brīvais vilnis" became a closed firm and ended trading on the regulated market.
Manas Bank – formerly Insan Bank in Bishkek, Kyrgyzstan. Acquired in 2008. Placed in insolvent liquidation on 6 July 2015. Position - Sole owner. On a petition from the Republic of Kyrgyzstan, the Paris Court of Appeal of the French Republic found on 21 February 2017 "that Insan Bank was taken over by Mr Belokon in order to develop, in a state where his privileged relations with the holder of economic power guaranteed him the absence of any true monitoring of his activities, money laundering practices which could not have flourished in the less favourable environment of Latvia." Belokons and 31 others were indicted by Kyrgyz authorities for alleged money laundering.
Since 2007- JSC Investment Management Company Global Fondi - co-founded by ex Prime Minister of Latvia, The former Chairman of National Bank of Latvia - Einars Repše
Since 2009 - JSC Hercogiste - company's aim is to develop sustainable projects in Latvia

Media 
Otkritij Gorod – a monthly magazine in Baltic countries
Novo News – a daily Internet newspaper
Since 1995 - Valērijs Belokoņs's Publishing House Ltd – became popular with the National encyclopaedia Latvijas Enciklopēdija and annual edition Who's Who in Latvia

Social Projects 
Baltic Institute of Strategic Studies –  a non-profit scientific research organization founded in 2004.

Blackpool F.C. 
Through Belokoņs Holdings and VB Football Assets, Belokon bought a 20% stake in Blackpool Football Club in 2006, and is the club's president. In June 2007 he stated that he was prepared to increase his stake in Blackpool from 20% to 50% following the club's promotion to The Championship.

On 8 July 2008, Belokoņs announced that he and Owen Oyston, the majority share-holder of the club, would be personally financing the construction of the new South Stand and South-west corner at Bloomfield Road, with work to start immediately.

On 31 July 2009, it was announced that Belokoņs was setting up a new transfer fund for Blackpool, into which he was adding a "considerable amount" on 5 August in order to invest in new players identified by team manager Ian Holloway.

On 22 May 2010, Blackpool were promoted to the top tier of English football, the Premier League, one year sooner than Belokoņs had predicted when joining the club in 2006.

In September 2015, Belokoņs initiated legal action against the Oystons, alleging improper use of club funds.

In August 2017, Belokoņs resigned as director of Blackpool. In November 2017 a court determined that Owen Oyston and his son had abused their majority shareholding position at the club in a manner that was detrimental both to the business and Belokons himself. They were ordered to pay £31 million to buy out Belokons' share of the business.

Simon Sadler became Blackpool's new owner in June 2019. He acquired a 96.2% stake in the club.

Personal life
Belokoņs has three children.

Notes

References

External links
[BBC Russian Service, 21 December 2018, Latvia has Opened KGB Archives. Head of the Church, Former PM and a Significant Businessman happened to be There: https://www.bbc.com/russian/features-46653022]
[Press release of the Latvian Financial and Capital Market Commission: http://www.fktk.lv/en/publications/press-releases/5657-fcmc-applies-fines-to-as-baltic-international-bank-and-its-board-chair.html]
[The Guardian: https://www.theguardian.com/football/2018/oct/18/blackpool-takeover-valeri-belokon-owen-oyston]
"Tangerine dream" – a Q&A with Belokon from BBC Sport
Belokon Holdings website
Baltic International Bank website
Social project - Bibliotēka (Library)
The Prince's Foundation for the Built Environment website

1960 births
Living people
Latvian football chairmen and investors
Blackpool F.C. directors and chairmen
Businesspeople from Riga
University of Latvia alumni